Gerrard DeLeeuw (April 21, 1926 - December 2, 2014) was a Canadian football player who played for the Winnipeg Blue Bombers. He was from St. Vital, Manitoba, where he also played junior football.

References

1926 births
Winnipeg Blue Bombers players
2014 deaths